John Crerar may refer to:
John Crerar (industrialist), American industrialist
John Crerar (gamekeeper), Scottish gamekeeper
John Crerar (Canadian politician), lawyer and politician in Manitoba, Canada